Geoffrey Curtis MacLellan (born December 18, 1978) is a Canadian politician in the province of Nova Scotia.

Political career
He was elected to the Nova Scotia House of Assembly in a by-election on June 22, 2010, and represented the electoral district of Glace Bay as a Liberal until his retirement from politics in 2021.

MacLellan was re-elected in the 2013 election. On October 22, 2013, MacLellan was appointed to the Executive Council of Nova Scotia where he served as Minister of Transportation and Infrastructure Renewal as well as Minister responsible for the Sydney Tar Ponds Agency and Minister responsible for the Sydney Steel Corporation Act. He was re-elected in the 2017 election.

On June 15, 2017, Premier Stephen McNeil shuffled his cabinet, moving MacLellan to Minister of Business, Minister of Energy, Minister of Trade, and Minister of Service Nova Scotia. On July 5, 2018, MacLellan lost his position as Minister of Energy in a cabinet shuffle, but retained the other portfolios he had prior to the shuffle.

On February 4, 2021, MacLellan announced that he would not seek re-election.

Electoral record

|-
 
|Liberal
|Geoff MacLellan
|align="right"|5,547
|align="right"|80.36
|align="right"|
 
|NDP
|Mary Beth MacDonald
|align="right"|1,001
|align="right"|14.50
|align="right"|
|-
 
|PC
|Thomas Bethell
|align="right"|355
|align="right"|5.14
|align="right"|
|-
|}

 
|NDP
|Myrtle Campbell
|align="right"|2,281
|align="right"|31.52
|align="right"|
 
|PC
|Michelle Wheelhouse
|align="right"|759
|align="right"|10.48
|align="right"|

|Independent
|Edna Lee
|align="right"|195
|align="right"|2.69
|align="right"|

References

External links
Members of the Nova Scotia Legislative Assembly
Liberal caucus profile

1978 births
Nova Scotia Liberal Party MLAs
Living people
Members of the Executive Council of Nova Scotia
21st-century Canadian politicians